This is a list of state leaders in the 7th century (601–700) AD.

Africa

Africa: East

Kingdom of Aksum (complete list) –
Gersem, King (c.600)
Armah, King (c.614)
Ashama ibn-Abjar, King (?–c.630)

Africa: Northeast

Makuria (complete list) –
Merkurios, King (697–c.722)
Zacharias I, King (c.722)

Americas

Americas: Mesoamerica

Maya civilization

Calakmul (complete list) –
Scroll Serpent, King (579–611)
Yuknoom Ti' Chan, King (619)
Tajoom Uk'ab K'ahk', King (622–630)
Yuknoom Head, King (630–636)
Yuknoom Ch'een II, King (636–686)
Yuknoom Yich'aak K'ahk', King (686–c.695)
Split Earth, King (c.695)

Copán (complete list) –
K'ak' Chan Yopaat, King (578–628)
Chan Imix K'awiil, King (628–695)
Uaxaclajuun Ub'aah K'awiil, King (695–738)

Palenque (complete list) –
Yohl Ik'nal, Queen (583–604)
Ajen Yohl Mat, Ajaw (605–612)
Janahb Pakal, Nobleman (c.612) 
Sak K'uk', Queen (612–615)
K'inich Janaab Pakal I, Ajaw (615–683)
K'inich Kan Bahlam II, Ajaw (684–702)

Tikal (complete list) –
23rd Ruler, Ajaw (c.635)
24th Ruler, Ajaw (c.645)
Nuun Ujol Chaak, Ajaw (pre-657–c.679)
Jasaw Chan K'awiil I, Ajaw (682–734)

Asia

Asia: Central

Xueyantuo (complete list) –
Yiedie, Khan (600s–610s)
Zhenzhu, Khan (628–645)
Duomi, Khan (645–646)
Yitewushi, Khan (646)

Tibet

Tibetan Empire (complete list) –
Tagbu Nyasig, King (579–619)
Namri Songtsen, King (?–629) 
Songtsen Gampo, Emperor (618–649)
Gungsrong Gungtsen, Emperor (638–c.655)
Mangsong Mangtsen, Emperor (653–676)
Tridu Songtsen, Emperor (676–704)
Khri ma lod, Empress (675–689, 704–712)

Kazakhstan

Gaochang
Qú Qiángù, ruler (560-601)
Qú Bóyǎ[42], ruler (601-613, 619-623)
unnamed usurper, ruler (613-619)
Qú Wéntài, ruler (623-640)
Qú Zhìshèng, ruler (640)

Asia: East

Turks

Eastern Turkic Khaganate (complete list) –
Yami, Qaghan (603–609)
Shibi, Qaghan (611–619)
Chuluo, Qaghan (619–621)
Illig, Qaghan (620–630)
Qilibi, Qaghan (639–645)
Chebi, Qaghan (c.646–650)

Second Turkic Khaganate (complete list) –
Ilterish, Founder, Qaghan (681–694)
Qapaghan, Qaghan (694–716)

China: Sui dynasty

Sui dynasty (complete list) –
Wen, Emperor (581–604)
Yang, Emperor (604–618)
Yang You, Emperor (617–618)
Yang Tong, Emperor (618–619)

China: Tang dynasty

Tang dynasty (complete list) –
Gaozu, Emperor (618–626)
Taizong, Emperor (626–649)
Gaozong, Emperor (650–683)
Zhongzong, Emperor (684, 705–710)
Ruizong, Emperor (684–690, 710–712)
Zhou dynasty –
Wu Zetian, Empress regnant (690–705)

Japan
Japan, Asuka period (complete list) –
Suiko, Empress (592–628)
Jomei, Emperor (629–641)
Kōgyoku, Empress (642–645)
Kōtoku, Emperor (645–654)
Saimei, Empress (655–661)
Tenji, Emperor (661–672)
Kōbun, Emperor (672)
Tenmu, Emperor (672–686)
Jitō, Empress (686–697)
Monmu, Emperor (697–707)

Korea

Baekje (complete list) –
Beop, King (599–600)
Mu, King (600–641)
Uija, King (641–660)

Goguryeo (complete list) –
Yeong-yang, King (590–618)
Yeong-nyu, King (618–642)
Bojang, King (642–668)

Silla (complete list) –
Jinpyeong, King (579–632)
Seondeok, King (632–647)
Jindeok, King (647–654)
Muyeol, King (654–661)

Later Silla (complete list) –
Munmu, King (661–681)
Sinmun, King (681–691)
Hyoso, King (692–702)

Balhae (complete list) –
Go, King (698–719)

Asia: Southeast

Cambodia
Chenla (complete list) –
Mohendravarman, King (c.590–611)
Isanavarman I, King (616–637)
Bhavavarman II, King (639–657)
Jayavarman I, King (c.657–681/690)
Jayavedi, Queen (c.681–713)

Indonesia: Java

East Java –
Dewasimha, King (7th/8th century)

Shailendra dynasty –
Santanu, King (c.650)
Dapunta Selendra, King (c.674)

Kalingga Kingdom: Shailendra dynasty –
Shima, Queen (674—703)

Tarumanagara (complete list) –
Kertawarman, Maharaja (561–628)
Linggawarman, Maharaja (628–650)
Tarusbawa, Maharaja (669–690)

Sunda Kingdom (complete list) –
Tarusbawa, Maharaja (669–723)

Galuh Kingdom (complete list) –
Wretikandayun, Maharaja (612-702)

Malaysia: Peninsular
Kedah Sultanate (complete list) –
Maha Dewa II, Maharaja (c.580–620)
Maha Dewa III, Maharaja (c.620–660)
DiMaharaja Putra II, Maharaja (c.660–712)

Thailand

Ngoenyang (complete list) –
Lavachakkaraj, King (638–mid 7th century)
Lao Khao Kaew Mah Mueng, King (late 7th century)
Lao Sao, King (7th–8th century)

Hariphunchai (complete list) –
Camadevi, Queen (7th/8th century)

Vietnam

Champa (complete list) –
Kandarpadharma, King (629–?)
Prabhasadharma, King (?–645)
Bhadresvaravarman, King (645–?)
Isanavarman, Queen (?–653)
Vikrantavarman I, King (653–c.686)
Vikrantavarman II, King (c.686–c.731)

Early Lý dynasty (complete list) –
Hậu Lý Nam Đế, Emperor (571–603)

Asia: South

Afghanistan

Turk Shahi (complete list) –
Shahi Tegin, King (680–739)

Bengal and Northeast India

Gauda Kingdom (complete list) –
Shashanka, King (c.590–625)
Manava, King (625)

Kamarupa: Varman dynasty (complete list) –
Bhaskaravarman, King (600–650)
Avantivarman, King (unknown)

Kamarupa: Mlechchha dynasty (complete list) –
Salasthamba, King (650–670)
Vigrahastambha, King (670–680)
Palaka, King (680–695)
Kumara, King (695–710)

Khadga dynasty –
Khadgodyama, King (625–640)
Jatakhadga, King (640–658)
Devakhadga, King (658–673)
Rajabhat, King (673–707)

Mallabhum (complete list) –
Adi Malla, King (694–710)

India

Chahamanas of Shakambhari (complete list) –
Samantaraja, King (c.684–709)

Chalukya dynasty (complete list) –
Mangalesha, King (c.592–610)
Pulakeshin II, King (c.610–642)
Adityavarman, King (c.643–645)
Abhinavaditya, King (c.645–646)
Chandraditya, King (c.646–649)
Vijaya-Bhattarika, Regent (c.650–655)
Vikramaditya I, King (c.655–680)
Vinayaditya, King (680–696)
Vijayaditya, King (696–733)

Eastern Chalukyas (complete list) –
Kubja Vishnuvardhana, King (624–641)
Jayasimha I, King (641–673)
Indra Bhattaraka, King (673)
Vishnu Vardhana II, King (673–682)
Mangi Yuvaraja, King (682–706)

Eastern Ganga dynasty (complete list) –
Indravarman III, King (589–652)
Gunarnava, King (652–682)
Devendravarman I, King (c.652–682)

Western Ganga dynasty (complete list) –
Mushkara, King (579–604) 
Polavira, King (604–629)
Srivikrama, King (629–654)
Bhuvikarma, King (654–679) 
Shivamara I, King (679–726)

Kalachuris of Tripuri (complete list) –
Vamaraja-deva, King (675–700)

Maitraka dynasty (complete list) –
Śīlāditya I, King (c.595–c.615)
Kharagraha I, King (c.615–c.626)
Dharasena III, King (c.626–c.640)
Dhruvasena II, King (c.640–c.644)
Chakravarti, King (c.644–c.651)
Dhruvasena III, King (c.650–c.654–655)
Kharagraha II, King (c.655–c.658)
Śīlāditya II, King (c.658–c.685)
Śīlāditya III, King (c.690–c.710)

Maukhari dynasty (complete list) –
Graha-varman, King (c.600–605)

Pallava dynasty –
The Pallava dynasty has two chronologies of rulers.
Mahendravarman I, King (6th/7th century)
Narasimhavarman I, King (630–668)
Mahendravarman II, King (668–672)
Paramesvaravarman I, King (late 7th century)
Empire of Harsha –
Harsha, King (c.606–c.647)

Pandyan dynasty (complete list) –
Kadungon, King (590–620)
Koon Pandiyan, King (7th century)
Maravarman Avanisulamani, King (c.620–645)
Jayantavarman, King (c.645–670)
Arikesari Maravarman, King (c.670–710)

Pushyabhuti dynasty (complete list) –
Prabhakara-vardhana, King (c.580–605)
Rajya-vardhana, King (c.605–606)
Harsha, King (c.606–c.647)

Vishnukundina dynasty (complete list) –
Janssraya Madhava Varma IV, Maharaja (573–621)

Pakistan

Rai dynasty (complete list) –
Rai Sahiras II, King (early 7th century)
Rai Sahasi II, King (early 7th century)

Sri Lanka

Anuradhapura Kingdom, Sri Lanka (complete list) –
Aggabodhi II, King (598–608)
Sangha Tissa II, King (608–608)
Moggallana III, King (608–614)
Silameghavanna, King (614–623)
Aggabodhi III, King (623–623)
Jettha Tissa III, King (623–624)
Aggabodhi III, King (624–640)
Dathopa Tissa I, King (640–652)
Kassapa II, King (652–661)
Dappula I, King (661–664)
Dathopa Tissa II, King (664–673)
Aggabodhi IV, King (673–689)
Unhanagara Hatthadatha, King (691–691)
Manavanna, King (691–726)

Asia: West

Islam

Muslims –
Muhammad, Prophet (c.610–632)
Rashidun Caliphate (complete list) –
Abu Bakr, Caliph (632–634)
Umar, Caliph (634–644)
Uthman, Caliph (644–656)
Ali, Caliph (656–661)

Hasan ibn Ali's Caliphate (complete list) –
Hasan ibn Ali, Caliph (661)

Umayyad Caliphate (complete list) –
Muawiyah I, Caliph (661 — 680)
Yazid I, Caliph (680–683)
Muawiya II, Caliph (683–684)
Marwan I, Caliph (684–685)
Abd al-Malik, Caliph (685–705)

Turks

Western Turkic Khaganate (complete list) –
Niri, Qaghan of the Apa line (c.600)
Heshana, Qaghan (603–611)
Sheguy, Qaghan (611–618)
Tong Yabghu, Qaghan (618–628)
Külüg Sibir, Qaghan (630–631)
Irbis Bolun Cabgu, Qaghan (631–633)
Dulu, Qaghan (633–634)
Ishbara Tolis, Qaghan (634–638)
Yukuk Shad, Qaghan (638–642)
Irbis Seguy, Qaghan (642–651)
Ashina Helu, Qaghan (651–658)

Persia

Persia: Sasanian Empire (complete list) –
Khosrow II, Shahanshah, King of Kings (591–628)
Vistahm,§ Shahanshah, King of Kings (591–596)
Kavadh II, Shahanshah, King of Kings (628)
Ardashir III, Shahanshah, King of Kings (628–629)
Shahrbaraz, rival/usurper Shahanshah, King of Kings (629)
Khosrow III, rival/usurper Shahanshah, King of Kings (629)
Borandukht, Shahanshah, King of Kings (629–630)
Shapur-i Shahrvaraz,§ Shahanshah, King of Kings (630)
Peroz II,§ Shahanshah, King of Kings (630)
Azarmidokht, Shahanshah, King of Kings (630–631)
Farrukh Hormizd, rival/usurper Shahanshah, King of Kings (630–631)
Hormizd VI, rival/usurper Shahanshah, King of Kings (630–631)
Khosrow IV, rival/usurper Shahanshah, King of Kings (631)
Farrukhzad Khosrau V,§ Shahanshah, King of Kings (631)
Boran, Shahanshah, King of Kings (631–632)
Yazdegerd III, Shahanshah, King of Kings (632–651)

Dabuyid dynasty (complete list) –
Gil Gavbara, Spahbed (642–660)
Dabuya, Spahbed (660–712)

Yemen

Yemeni Zaidi State (complete list) –
Al-Hasan al-Muthanna, Imam (680–706)

Europe

Europe: Balkans

Old Great Bulgaria (complete list) –
Organa, Regent (617–630)
Gostun, Regent (c.630–c.632)
Kubrat, ruler (c.632–c.650/65)

First Bulgarian Empire (complete list) –
Asparuh, Khan (c.681–701)

Byzantine Empire (complete list) –
Maurice, Emperor (582–602) 
Theodosius, Co-Emperor (590–602)
Phocas, Emperor (602–610)
Heraclius, Emperor (610–641)
Constantine III, co-Emperor (613–641), Emperor (641)
Heraklonas, co-Emperor (641), Emperor (641)
Constans II, Emperor (641–668)
Constantine IV, co-Emperor (654–668), Emperor (668–685)
Heraclius, Co-Emperor (659–681)
Tiberius, Co-Emperor (659–681)
Justinian II, co-Emperor (681–685), Emperor (685–695, 705–711)
Leontios, Emperor (695–698)
Tiberios III, Emperor (698–705)
Justinian II, co-Emperor (668–685), Emperor (685–695, 705–711)

Principality of Serbia (complete list) –
unknown archon (fl.610–641)

Europe: British Isles

Man

Isle of Man (complete list) –
Diwg, client King (c.600s)
Edwin of Northumbria, King (620–633)
, King (?–c.682)
, King (c.682–?)

Great Britain: Scotland

Dál Riata (complete list) –
Áedán mac Gabráin, King (?–c.606)
Eochaid Buide, King (?–c.629)
Connad Cerr, King (?–c.629)
Domnall Brecc, King (?–c.642)
Ferchar mac Connaid, King (unknown)
Dúnchad mac Conaing, King (?–c.654)
Conall Crandomna, King (?–c.660)
Domangart mac Domnaill, King (?–c.660)
Máel Dúin mac Conaill, King (?–c.689)
Domnall Donn, King (?–c.696)
Ferchar Fota, King (?–c.697)
Eochaid mac Domangairt, King (unknown)
Ainbcellach mac Ferchair, King (?–c.698)
Fiannamail ua Dúnchado, King (?–700)

Picts (complete list) –
Nechtan nepos Uerb, King (595–616)
Cinioch, King (616–631)
Gartnait III, King (631–635)
Bridei II, King (635–641)
Talorc III, King (641–653)
Talorgan I, King (653–657)
Gartnait IV, King (657–663)
Drest VI, King (663–672)
Bridei III, King (672–693)
Taran, King (693–697)
Bridei IV, King (697–706)
Nechtan, King (706–724, 728–729)

Kingdom of Strathclyde / Alt Clut (complete list) –
Rhydderch Hael, King, (fl.573–612)
Neithon / Nechtan / Nwython, King (612–621)
Beli I, King (621–633)
Eugein I, King (633–645)
Guret, King (645–658)
Mermin, King (?–682)
Elfin(?–693)
Dumnagual II, King (693–694)
Beli II, King (694–722)

Great Britain: Northumbria

Bernicia (complete list) –
Æthelfrith, King (593–616)
Edwin, King (616–632)
Eanfrith, King (632–633)
Oswald, King (634–641)
Oswiu, King (642–670)

Deira (complete list) –
Æthelric, King (589–604)
Æthelfrith, King (604–616)
Edwin, King (616–632)
Osric, King (633–634)
Oswald, King (634–642)
Oswiu, King (642–644)
Oswine, King (644–651)
Œthelwald, King (651–654)
Oswiu, King (654–670)
Alchfrith, Co-King (656–664)
Ælfwine, King (670–679)
Kingdom of Northumbria (complete list) –
Oswiu, King (642–670)
Ecgfrith, King (670–685)
Ealdfrith, King (685–704/705)

Great Britain: England

The Britons (complete list) –
Selyf ap Cynan, King (?–c.613)
Ceretic of Elmet, King (c.614–617)
Cadwallon ap Cadfan, King (?–634)
Idris, King (?–635)
Eugein I of Alt Clut, King (c.642)
Cadwaladr, King (c.654–c.664)
Geraint, King (c.670–c.710)

Dumnonia (complete list) –
Bledric ap Custennin, King (c.598–c.613)
Clemen ap Bledric, King (c.613–c.633)
Petroc Baladrddellt, King (c.633–c.654)
Culmin ap Petroc, King (c.659–c.661)
Donyarth ap Culmin, King (c.661–c.700)
Geraint of Dumnonia, King (c.700–c.710)

Kingdom of East Anglia (complete list) –
Rædwald, King (593–624)
Eorpwald, King (625–627)
Ricberht, King (c.627–630)
Sigeberht, Co-King (c.629–c.634) 
Ecgric, Co-King (c.630–c.636)
Anna, King (c.636–654)
Æthelhere, King (653/654–655)
Æthelwold, King (c.654–664)
Ealdwulf, King (663–c.713)

Kingdom of Essex (complete list) –
Sledd, King (587–604)
Sæberht, Co-King (604–616/617)
Sexred, Co-King (616/617–617)
Sæward, Co-King (616/617–617)
Sigeberht I (the Little), King (617–653)
Sigeberht II (the Good), King (653–660)
Swithhelm, King (660–664)
Sighere, Co-King (664–683) 
Sæbbi, Co-King (664–694)
Sigeheard, Co-King (694–709)
Swæfred, Co-King (694–709)

Kingdom of Kent (complete list) –
Æthelberht I, King (c.590–616)
Eadbald, King (616–640)
Eorcenberht, King (640–664)
Eormenred, King (unknown)
Ecgberht I, King (664–673)
Hlothhere, King (674/675–685)
Eadric, King (685–686)
Mul, King (killed 687)
Swæfheard, King (687/688–post–692)
Swæfberht, King (fl. 689)
Oswine, King (fl. 689–690)
Wihtred, King (c.693–725)

Mercia (complete list –
Creoda, King (c.585–593)
Pybba, King (c.593–606/615)
Cearl, King (?–c.626)
Eowa, King (c.626–642)
Penda, King (c.626–655)
Peada, King (655–656)
Oswiu, King (c.657)
Wulfhere, King (658–675)
Æthelred I, King (675–704)

Kingdom of Sussex (complete list) –
Æðelwealh, King (fl. c.660–c.685)
Eadwulf, King (fl. c.683)
Ecgwald, King (fl. c.683–c.685)
Berhthun, King (fl. 685)
Andhun, King (fl. 685)
Noðhelm, King (fl. 692–717)
Watt, King (fl. 692–c.700)
Bryni, King (fl. c.700)

Kingdom of Wessex (complete list) –
Ceolwulf, King (597–611)
Cynegils, King (611–643)
Cwichelm, King (c.626–636)
Cenwalh, King (643–645, 648–674)
Penda of Mercia, King (645–648)
Seaxburh, King (672–674)
Æscwine, King (674–676)
Centwine, King (676–685)
Cædwalla, King (685–688)
Ine, King (688–726)

Great Britain: Wales

Kingdom of Ceredigion/ Seisyllwg –
Arthlwys ap Arthwfoddw, King (595–630)
, King (630–665)
Seisyll ap Clydog, King (665–700)
Arthen ap Seisyll, King (700–735)

Kingdom of Gwent (complete list) –
Athrwys ap Meurig, King (c.620)
Morgan the Courteous and Benefactor, King (?–654)
Anthres ap Morcant ?, King (654–663)

Kingdom of Gwynedd (complete list) –
Iago ap Beli, King (c.599–c.616)
Cadfan ap Iago, King (c.613–c.625)
Cadwallon ap Cadfan, King (c.625–634)
Cadafael Cadomedd ap Cynfeddw, King (634–c.655)
Cadwaladr, King (c.655–c.682)
Idwal Roebuck, King (c.682–c.720)

Kingdom of Powys (complete list) –
Cynan Garwyn, King (582–610)
Selyf ap Cynan, King (610–613)
Manwgan ap Selyf, King (613)
Eiludd Powys, King (613–?)
Beli ap Eiludd, King (655)
Gwylog ap Beli, King (695–725)

Ireland

Ireland (complete list) –
Áed Uaridnach, High King (601–607)
Máel Coba mac Áedo, High King (608–610)
Suibne Menn, High King (611–623)
Domnall mac Áedo, High King (624–639)
Cellach and Conall, High Kings (640–656)
Diarmait and Blathmac, High Kings (657–664)
Sechnassach, High King (665–669)
Cenn Fáelad, High King (670–673)
Fínsnechta Fledach, High King (674–693)
Loingsech mac Óengusso, High King (694–701)

Airgíalla (complete list) –
Aed mac Colgan, King (?–606)
Mael Odhar Macha, King (?–636)
Dunchad mac Ultan, King (?–c.677)
Mael Fothartaig mac Mael Dubh, King (fl.697)

Breifne (complete list) –
Maenach mac Báithin, King (c.653)

Connachta (complete list) –
Muiredach Muillethan, King (697–702)

Leinster (complete list) –
Cellach Cualann, King (693–715)

Uí Maine (complete list) –
Seachnasach, King (691–711)

Ulaid / Ulster (complete list) –
Bécc Bairrche mac Blathmaic, King (692–707)

Europe: Central
Bavaria (complete list) –
Tassilo I, Duke (591–610)
Garibald II, Duke (610–625)
Theodo, Duke (c.680–716)

Duchy of Alsace (see also) –
Uncilin, Duke (587–607)
Gunzo, Duke (fl.613)
Chrodobert, Duke (fl.630)
Gundoin, Duke (fl.630s)
Leuthari II, Duke (fl.642)
Boniface, Duke (?–c.662)
Adalrich, Duke (c.662–post-683)
Adalbert, Duke (post-683–723)

Samo's Empire
Samo, King (623–658)	

Old Saxony (complete list) –
Berthoald, Duke (fl.622)

Sorbs –
Dervan, King (fl.615–636)

Thuringia (complete list) –
Radulf, Duke (c.633–642) King (c.642)
Heden I, Duke (642–687)
Gozbert, Duke (687–689)
Heden II, Duke (689–719)

Europe: East

Old Great Bulgaria –
Kubrat, Khan (632–665)
Batbayan, Khan (665–668)

Volga Bulgaria (complete list) – 
Kotrag, Potentate (675–710)

Khazar Khaganate (complete list) –
Ashina dynasty: Khazar Khagans
Ziebel, Khagan (618–630)
Böri Shad, Khagan (630–650)
Irbis, Khagan (650)
Khalga, Khagan (mid 660s)
Kaban, Khagan (late 660s)
Busir, Khagan (c.690–715)
Khazar Beks
Chorpan Tarkhan, Bek (c.630)

Utigurs –
Organa, Kavkhan, Regent for Kubrat (617–630)
Gostun, Kavkhan, Regent for Kubrat (c.630)

Europe: Nordic

Sweden (complete list) –
Sölve, King (late 6th–early 7th century)
Ingvar, King (early 7th century)
Anund, King (early–mid 7th century)
Ingjald, King (mid 7th century)
Ivar Vidfamne, King (c.655–c.695)

Europe: Southcentral

Principality of Benevento (complete list) –
Zotto, Duke (571–591)
Arechis I, Duke (591–641)
Aiulf I, Duke (641–642)
Radoald, Duke (642–647)
Grimoald I, Duke (647–662)
Romoald I, Duke (662–687)
Grimoald II, Duke (687–689)
Gisulf I, Duke (689–706)

Kingdom of the Lombards (complete list) –
Agilulf, King (590–616)
Adaloald, King (616–626)
Arioald, King (626–636)
Rothari, King (636-652)
Rodoald, King (652–653)
Aripert I, King (653–661)
Godepert, King (661–662)
Perctarit, King (661–662)
Grimoald, King (662–671)
Garibald, King (671)
Perctarit, King (671–688)
Cunipert, King (688–689)
Alahis, King (689)
Cunipert, King (689–700)
Liutpert, King (700–702)

Duchy of Spoleto (complete list) –
Ariulf, Duke (592–602)
Theodelap, Duke (602–650)
Atto, Duke (650–665)
Transamund I, Duke (665–703)

Republic of Venice (complete list) –
Paolo Lucio Anafesto, Doge (697–717)

Europe: Southwest

Visigothic Kingdom (complete list) –
Liuva II, King (601–603)
Witteric, King (603–610)
Gundemar, King (610–612)
Sisebut, King (612–621)
Reccared II, King (621)
Suintila, King (621–631)
Reccimer, King (626–631)
Sisenand, King (631–636)
Iudila, King (632–633)
Chintila, King (636–640)
Tulga, King (640–641)
Chindasuinth, King (641–653)
Recceswinth, King (649–672)
Froia, King (653)
Wamba, King (672–680)
Hilderic, King (672)
Paul, King (672–673)
Erwig, King (680–687)
Egica, King (687–702)
Suniefred, King (693)
Wittiza, King (694–710)

Europe: West

Champagne (complete list) –
Vintronus, Duke (?)
Drogo, Duke (690–708)

Frisian Kingdom (complete list) –
Audulf, King (c.600)
Adgillus I, King (?–680)
Redbad, King (678–719)

County of Paris (complete list) –
Saint Warinus, Count (?–678)

County of Poitou (complete list) –
Saint Warinus, Count (638–677)

Franks
Frankish Empire –
Kings (complete list) –
Theudebert II, King (595–612)
Theuderic II, King (612–613)
Sigebert II, King (613)
Chilperic I, King (561–584)
Chlothar II the Great, King (584–623)
Dagobert I, King (623–634)
Charibert II, King (629–632)
Chilperic, King (632)
Sigebert III, King (634–656)
Childebert the Adopted, King (656–661)
Clovis II, King (639–657)
Chlothar III, King (657–673)
Childeric II, King (662–675)
Theuderic III, King (675–691)
Dagobert II, King (675–679)
Clovis IV, King (691–695)
Childebert III, King (695–711)
Mayors of the Palace (complete list) –
Pepin I, Mayor of the Palace (623–629, 639–640)
Adalgisel, Mayor of the Palace (629–639)
Otto, Mayor of the Palace (640–642/643)
Grimoald the Elder, Mayor of the Palace (642/643–656)
Wulfoald, Mayor of the Palace (656–680)
Pepin II of Herstal
Mayor of the Palace (680–714)
Duke and Prince of the Franks (687–714)

Austrasia of the Franks (complete list) –
Theudebert II, King (595–612)
Theuderic II, King (612–613)
Sigebert II, King (613)
Chlothar II, King (613–623)
Dagobert I, King (623–634)
Sigebert III, King (634–656/660)
Childebert the Adopted, King (656–661)
Chlothar III, King (661–662)
Childeric II, King (662–675)
Clovis III, King (675–676)
Theuderic III, King (679–691)
Clovis IV, King (691–695)
Childebert III, King (695–711)

Neustria of the Franks (complete list) –
Clotaire II, King (584–629)
Dagobert I, King ((634–639)
Clovis II, King ((639–655)
Chlothar III, King (655–673)
Theuderic III, King (673)
Childeric II, King ((673–675)
Theuderic III, King ((675–691)
Clovis IV, King (691–695)
Childebert III, King (695–711)

Kingdom of Burgundy (complete list) - 
Theuderic II (595–613), also King of Austrasia
Sigebert II (613), also King of Austrasia

Aquitaine (complete list) –
Chram, Duke (555–560)
Desiderius, Duke (583–587)
Bladast, Duke (583–587)
Gundoald, usurper King (584/585)
Austrovald, Duke (587–589)
Sereus, Duke (589–592)
Charibert II, King (629–632)
Chilperic, King (632)
Boggis, Duke (c.632–660)
Felix, Duke (c.660–670)
Lupus I, Duke (c.670–676)
Odo the Great, Duke (c.688–c.735)

Eurasia: Caucasus

Kingdom of Abkhazia (complete list) –
Phinictios, King (c.580–610)
Barnucius, King (c.610–640)
Demetrius I, King (c.640–660)
Theodosius I, King (c.660–680)
Constantine I, King (c.680–710)

Arminiya (complete list) –
Muhammad ibn Marwan, Emir (c.695–705)

Principality of Iberia (complete list) –
Guaram I, Prince (588–c.590)
Stephen I, Prince (c.590–627)
Adarnase I, Prince (627–637/642)
Stephen II, Prince (637/642–c.650)
Adarnase II, Prince (c.650–684)
Guaram II, Prince (684–c.693)
Guaram III, Prince (c.693–c.748)

First Kingdom of Kakheti (complete list) –
Adarnase I, Prince (c.580–637)
Stephanus I, also prince of Iberia, Prince (637–650)
Adarnase II, prince of Iberia, Prince (650–684)
Stephanus II, Prince (685–736)

See also
 List of political entities in the 7th century

References 

Leaders
 
-